Martin Deutinger (24 March 1815 – 9 September 1864) was a German philosopher and religious writer, born in Langenpreising, Bavaria, and died at Pfäfers, Switzerland.
 Catholic Encyclopedia article

German philosophers
1815 births
1864 deaths
German male writers